Huhana Smith (born 1962) is a contemporary New Zealand artist and academic, and head of Whiti o Rehua School of Art at Massey University. Between 2003 and 2009, she was senior curator Māori at Te Papa.

Background 
Born in 1962 in Yarrawonga, Victoria, Australia, Smith is of Māori descent and affiliates to Ngāti Tukorehe and Ngāti Raukawa ki te Tonga. She came to New Zealand in 1993 to pursue her studies in Māori language. She was the first graduate from the Bachelor of Māori Visual Arts programme at Massey in 1997. She also holds a Postgraduate Diploma in Museum Studies (1998) and a PhD in Māori Studies from Massey University.

Career 
Smith's recent research, part of a large interdisciplinary project with Deep South Challenge National Science Challenge funding combines mātauranga Māori methods with science to actively address climate change concerns for coastal Māori lands in Horowhenua-Kāpiti. It was exhibited in the Dowse Art Museum as part of the exhibition This Time of Useful Consciousness: Political Ecology Now in 2017.

Publications and exhibitions 
 Taiāwhio: Conversations with Contemporary Māori Artists, 2002, Te Papa Press.
 Taiāwhio 2: 18 New Conversations Contemporary Māori Artists, 2007, Te Papa Press.
 E Tū Ake: Māori Standing Strong, 2011, Te Papa Press.

Awards 

Smith was a finalist in the Art Waikato National Art Awards in 2000 and 2002.

References

External links 
 Smith on The Dowse Podcast on Soundcloud

1962 births
Living people
New Zealand Māori artists
Massey University alumni
Academic staff of the Massey University
People associated with the Museum of New Zealand Te Papa Tongarewa
Ngāti Raukawa people
New Zealand women curators